Haitian language may refer to:

 Haitian Creole (kreyòl ayisyen), a French-based creole language native to Haiti
 Haitian French, the variety of French spoken in Haiti
 Taíno language, an extinct indigenous language spoken in Haiti (or Hayti), the rest of the Greater Antilles and the Lucayan Archipelago; previously coined the Haitian language (or Haytian language)

See also 
 Languages of Haiti, the languages spoken or once spoken in Haiti